Malishegu is a nucleated farming community located along the Tamale-Kumbungu  trunk road in Tamale Metropolitan District in the Northern Region of Ghana. It is home to Malshegu Sacred Grove - a religious center and one of the last remaining closed canopy forests in the savannah regions of West Africa.

See also
Suburbs of Tamale (Ghana) metropolis

References 

Communities in Ghana
Suburbs of Tamale, Ghana